Witosław may refer to the following places:
Witosław, Greater Poland Voivodeship (west-central Poland)
Witosław, Kuyavian-Pomeranian Voivodeship (north-central Poland)
Witosław, Lubusz Voivodeship (west Poland)
Witosław, Choszczno County in West Pomeranian Voivodeship (north-west Poland)
Witosław, Sławno County in West Pomeranian Voivodeship (north-west Poland)